Falzè di Piave is a frazione of the municipality of Sernaglia della Battaglia in the Province of Treviso. It is located in the south-east corner of the Piave quarter between the Piave river and its tributary the Soligo.

Frazioni of the Province of Treviso